The 171st Infantry Brigade was an infantry brigade of the United States Army based at Fort Jackson, South Carolina. With a long history of serving, the brigade saw action during both World War I and World War II before it was inactivated in 1946. During the Cold War (in 1963) the brigade was once again activated for a period of ten years until again inactivated in 1972. In 2007 the brigade was reactivated as a training support unit and inactivated on 10 June 2016.

History

World War I
Constituted 5 August 1917 in the National Army as Headquarters, 171st Infantry Brigade, and assigned to the 86th Division. Organized 3 September 1917 at Camp Grant in Rockford, Illinois. Demobilized in January 1919 at Camp Grant, Illinois. Reconstituted 24 June 1921 in the Organized Reserves as Headquarters and headquarters Company, 171st Infantry Brigade, and assigned to the 86th Division. organized in July 1922 at Chicago, Illinois. Redesignated 23 March 1925 as Headquarters and Headquarters Company, 171st Brigade. Redesignated 24 August 1936 as Headquarters and Headquarters Company, 171st Infantry Brigade.
Composition 1917-1936
 Headquarters Company
 341st Infantry Regiment
 342nd Infantry Regiment
 332nd Machine Gun Battalion

World War II
Converted and redesignated 31 March 1942 as the 86th Reconnaissance Troop (less 3d Platoon), 86th Division (Headquarters and Headquarters Company, 172d Infantry Brigade, concurrently converted and redesignated as the 3d Platoon, 86th Reconnaissance Troop, 86th Division). Troop ordered into active military service 15 December 1942 and reorganized at Camp Howze, Texas, as the 86th Cavalry Reconnaissance Troop, an element of the 86th Infantry Division. Reorganized and redesignated 5 August 1943 as the 86th Reconnaissance Troop, Mechanized. Reorganized and redesignated 10 October 1945 as the 86th Mechanized Reconnaissance Troop. Inactivated 30 December 1946 in the Philippine Islands. (Organized Reserves redesignated 25 March 1948 as the Organized Reserve Corps; redesignated 9 July 1952 as the Army Reserve.)

Cold War
Converted and redesignated (less 3d Platoon) 20 May 1963 as Headquarters and Headquarters Company, 171st Infantry Brigade, and relieved from assignment to the 86th Infantry Division; concurrently withdrawn from the Army Reserve and allotted to the Regular Army (3d Platoon, 86th Reconnaissance Troop – hereafter separate lineage). Brigade activated 1 July 1963 at Fort Wainwright in Fairbanks, Alaska. Inactivated 13 November 1972 in Alaska.

While in Alaska included elements of the 40th Armor Regiment.

In 1964-1966 the 171st Infantry Brigade (Mechanized) included A Co, 40th Armor, 4th battalion, 9th inf: 1st battalion, 47th Infantry 15th field artillery, 171st transportation, (helicopters) and 171st support battalion.  In 1966 the 4th battalion, 9th infantry deployed to Vietnam. The 559th Engineer Company (Combat) was also a part of the 171st Infantry Brigade (M). In 1968 the 559th was commanded by Major William D. Anderson, who, after being assigned to South Vietnam was succeeded by the most capable Captain Peter V. B. Marshalk.

Although the 171st Infantry is now located in Fort Jackson, SC, the patch depicts the a sword with mountains of the Alaskan range and the Northern Lights. A similar patch of the 172nd Inf Brigade depicts the sword, mountains, and the constellation "Big Dipper."

The 171st Infantry Brigade was assigned to Fort Wainwright AK, near Fairbanks. Its primary mission was to defend Eielson AFB.  The 172nd Inf Brigade was near Anchorage, AK and its primary mission was to defend Elmendorf AFB.  Both brigades trained to fight under arctic conditions.

Post-Cold War

On 16 March 2007, the 171st Infantry Brigade was reactivated at Fort Jackson, South Carolina with the mission to support training resulting in the transformation of civilians into American soldiers. On 10 June 2016, as part of the overall drawdown of the Army, the brigade was inactivated in a ceremony at Fort Jackson, with subordinate units being inactivated or reassigned to other commands.

Headquarters & Headquarters Company
4th Battalion, 10th Infantry Regiment (reflagged as Special Troops Battalion on 1 October 2014; concurrent with the inactivation of the brigade, the STB was reassigned to the US Army Garrison)
Family Readiness and Support
HHC ATC
Company B (Ranges)
USA Student Detachment
17th Military Police Detachment
282d Army Band
120th Adjutant General Battalion (reassigned to the 193rd Infantry Brigade)
187th Ordnance Battalion (inactivated in 2015)
Drill Sergeant School
Task Force Marshall

Campaign participation credit
 World War I (Streamer without inscription)
 World War II
 Central Europe

References 

"The history of the 171st Infantry Brigade"
"The Brigade: A History, Its Organization and Employment in the US Army" the 1st of the 13th Inf was also assigned to the 171 (heavy foot) Bde. We were trained as both a mountain unit and an Arctic warfare unit. Toughest assignment I ever had

171
Military units and formations established in 1917
Military units and formations disestablished in 2016